Christian Dirschauer (born 13 May 1981) is a German politician. He has been a member of the Landtag of Schleswig-Holstein since 2020, and has been chairman of the South Schleswig Voters' Association since 2021.

Early life 
Dirschauer was born in Flensburg to a family of the Danish minority in Germany.

Political career 
In 2020 he replaced Flemming Meyer in the state parliament. In the 2022 state election, he entered the state parliament again via the state list of the SSW.

References 

1981 births
Living people
Danish minority of Southern Schleswig
21st-century German politicians
South Schleswig Voters' Association politicians
People from Flensburg

Members of the Landtag of Schleswig-Holstein